The 1930 Santa Barbara State Roadrunners football team represented Santa Barbara State during the 1930 college football season.

Santa Barbara State competed as an Independent in 1929 and 1930. They joined the Southern California Intercollegiate Athletic Conference (SCIAC) in 1931. The Roadrunners were led by third-year head coach Harold Davis and played home games at Peabody Stadium in Santa Barbara, California. They finished the season with a record of six wins, one loss and one tie (6–1–1). Overall, the team outscored its opponents 97–51 for the season.

Schedule

Notes

References

Santa Barbara State
UC Santa Barbara Gauchos football seasons
Santa Barbara State Roadrunners football